Willow Slough Fish and Wildlife Area is an area in Newton County, Indiana dedicated to providing hunting and fishing opportunities while maintaining , 1,800 of which are open water, marshes, and flooded crop land.

History
J.C. Murphey Lake, the park reservoir, was completed in 1951. Most parts of Willow Slough were once formerly grazed, hayed, and cultivated. A railroad also ran through the property at one time, and portions of an old train station can still be found in the area. It was also a mob dumping place for bodies in the 1920s-1980s. In 1986 the bodies of Chicago Outfit mobsters Anthony and Michael Spilotro were discovered in the preserve, events later depicted in the film Casino.

Rules and regulations
Besides the state fish and wildlife laws, the property is governed by posted regulations licensed by the Department of Natural Resources. The following regulations are listed below:
 Any violating of the regulations may cause forfeiting for your hunting, fishing, or visiting privileges.
 Must obtain a permit in order to hunt or fish.
 Night and predator hunting is only permitted by daily permit cards from the property manager.
 Camping, picnicking, and open campfires are allowed in designated areas only.
 Target ranges are open to the public on a first-come, first-served basis. All shooters must obey range rules and regulations.

Fishing
No check in is required for fishing, but fishing is prohibited during duck season. Primary species of fish include bass, bluegill, channel catfish, redear sunfish, crappie, and northern pike. Shoreline fishing is available, but only along designated piers. Two boat ramps are provided near the headquarters but may only be launched at the headquarters area.

Hunting
Willow Slough contains a variety of hunting species. These species include deer, quail, rabbit, squirrel, dove, woodcock, waterfowl and wild turkey. Daily check-ins are required for hunting and all hunting seasons and bag limits apply.

Wildlife Watching
 of varied geography including a  lake attract many wildlife species like deer, wild turkey, waterfowl, hawks, owls, osprey, bald eagles, and a variety of songbirds.

Additional information
Besides hunting and fishing, other opportunities include wetland trapping, dog training, and wild fruit gatherings.

References

Protected areas of Newton County, Indiana
Protected areas of Indiana